D'Amico or Di Amico is an Italian surname. Those with the surname include:

People
 Andrea D'Amico (footballer)
 Andrea D'Amico (football agent)
 Antonio D'Amico (born 1959), Italian model and fashion designer
 Hank D'Amico (1915–1965), American jazz clarinetist
 Ilaria D'Amico (born 1974), Italian commentator
 Jackie D'Amico (born 1937), American mobster and head of the Gambino crime family
 Jeff D'Amico (born 1975), American professional baseball player
 John D'Amico (disambiguation), multiple people
 Joseph D'Amico (born 1955), former Bonanno crime family soldier and informant
 Margarita D'Amico (1938–2017), Venezuelan journalist, researcher and professor
 Pasquale D'Amico, former Neapolitan Camorrista (mobster) who became a pentito (collaborator with the Italian authorities)
 Rudy D'Amico (born 1940), American National Basketball Association scout, and former college and professional basketball coach 
 Suso Cecchi d'Amico, Italian screenwriter
 Tamela D'Amico, American singer, actress, and filmmaker

Fictional characters
 Fat Tony (The Simpsons) (Anthony D'Amico), on The Simpsons animated series 

Italian-language surnames